Slavery in ancient Egypt existed at least since the Old Kingdom period. Discussions of slavery in Pharaonic Egypt are complicated by terminology used by the Egyptians to refer to different classes of servitude over the course of dynastic history; interpretation of the textual evidence of classes of slaves in ancient Egypt has been difficult to differentiate by word usage alone. There were three types of enslavement in Ancient Egypt: chattel slavery, bonded labor, and forced labor. But even these seemingly well-differentiated types of slavery are susceptible to individual interpretation. Egypt's labor culture encompassed many people of various social ranks.

The word translated as "slave" from the Egyptian language does not neatly align with modern terms or traditional labor roles. The classifications of "servant," "peasant," and "slave" could describe different roles in different contexts. Egyptian texts refer to words 'bAk' and 'Hm' that mean laborer or servant. Some Egyptian language refers to slave-like people as 'sqrw-anx', meaning "bound for life". Forms of forced labor and servitude are seen throughout all of ancient Egypt. Egyptians wanted dominion over their kingdoms and would alter political and social ideas to benefit their economic state. The existence of slavery not only was profitable for ancient Egypt, but made it easier to keep power and stability of the Kingdoms.

History

Old Kingdom

During the Old Kingdom Period, prisoners of war captured by Kemit's army were called skrw-'nh ("bound for life"). This was not a distinct term for "slave" but for prisoners of war, as already stated. The term, hm, emerged with at least two distinct usages: 1) “Laborer” and 2) “Servant”. Documented evidence exists as early as the reign of Sneferu, in the 26th century BC, war campaigns in the territory of Nubia, in which war-captives would be labeled skrw-'nh - and Libyans all of whom would be used to perform labour—regardless of their will otherwise—or – if warranted, would be conscripted into the military.  Reliefs from this period depict captured prisoners of war with their hands tied behind their backs. Nubia was targeted—because of its close geographical proximity, cultural similarity, and competitiveness in imperial dominion, and then the scope of campaigns intended to acquire foreign war captives expanded to Libya and Asia. Local Kemites also entered into servitude due to an unstable economy and debts. Officials who abused their power could also be reduced to servitude.

First Intermediate Period and Middle Kingdom

During the First Intermediate Period, slaves were first defined as men with dignity but remained treated as property. When borrowed money owed to wealthier individuals in Egyptian society could not be paid back, family members were sold in return into slavery - especially women. During the Middle Kingdom, records show that coerced laborers included conscripts (hsbw), fugitives (tsjw), and royal laborers (hmw-nsw). The Reisner Papyrus and the El Lahun papyri depict prisoners being employed in state enterprises. Papyrus Brooklyn 35.1446 also shows forced labor being performed on arable state land. If an individual coerced into labor attempted to escape or was absent from their work, they might be condemned to coerced labor for life. One of the El-Lahun papyri describes an example of this occurring: "Order issued by the Great Prison in year 31, third month of the summer season, day 5, that he be condemned with all his family to labor for life on state land, according to the decision of the court." Military expeditions continued to reduce Asiatics to slavery, and state-owned slaves (royal laborers) shared in the same status as these Asiatic slaves. Asiatics could often have Egyptian names but sometimes inscriptions or papyri mentioning them would still apply an ethnic qualification, such as one which mentions an "Asiatic Aduna and her son Ankhu". Both Asiatics and state-owned slaves could perform a variety of jobs: "We find royal laborers employed as fieldworkers, house servants, and cobblers; female laborers as hairdressers, gardeners, and weavers." If a household servant failed to adequately perform their job, they could be dismissed from the home they worked at. In some cases, servants appear to have become emotionally important to their household as depicted on the Cairo Bowl.

Second Intermediate Period and New Kingdom

One of the Berlin papyri show that by the time of the Second Intermediate Period, a slave could be owned by both an elite individual (like the king) and a community. In addition, the community had grown in power and now held the capacity to own and administer to public property, including that of slaves, replacing some of the traditional power of the king and his private royal laborers. By this period, slaves could also sometimes become citizens. One method by which this could happen was through marriage.

During the New Kingdom period, the military and its expenses grew and so additional coerced labor was needed to sustain it. As such, the "New Kingdom, with its relentless military operations, is the epoch of large-scale foreign slavery". Many more slaves were also acquired via the Mediterranean slave market, where Egypt was the main purchaser of international slaves. This Mediterranean market appears to have been controlled by Asiatic Bedouin who would capture individuals, such as travelers, and sell them on the market. The tomb of Ahmose I contains a biographical text which depicts several boasts regarding the capture of foreign Asiatic slaves. Egyptian servants were treated more humanely as employees, whereas foreign slaves were the objects of trade. The foreigners captured during military campaigns are, for example, referred to in the Annals of Thutmose III as "men in captivity" and individuals were referred to as "dependents" (mrj). In reward for his services in the construction of temples across Egypt, Thutmose III rewarded his official Minmose over 150 "dependents". During and after the reign of Amenhotep II, coerced temple labor was only performed by male and female slaves. At Medinet Habu, defeated Sea Peoples are recorded as having been captured as prisoners of war and reduced to slavery. During this period, slaves could sometimes be rented. One manuscript known as Papyrus Harris I records Ramses III claiming to have captured innumerable foreign slaves:

"I brought back in great numbers those that my sword has spared, with their hands tied behind their backs before my horses, and their wives and children in tens of thousands, and their livestock in hundreds of thousands. I imprisoned their leaders in fortresses bearing my name, and I added to them chief archers and tribal chiefs, branded and enslaved, tattooed with my name, their wives and children being treated in the same way."

In the Adoption Papyrus, the term "slave"/"servant" is contrasted with the term "free citizen (nmhj) of the land of the pharaoh". Often, the phrase nmhj traditionally refers to an orphan or poor. Methods by which slaves could attain their freedom included marriage or entering temple service (being 'purified'). The latter is depicted in, for example, the Restoration Stela of Tutankhamen. Ramesside Egypt saw a development in the institution of slavery where slaves could now become objects of private (rather than just public) property, and they could be bought and sold. Slaves themselves could now own some property and had a few legal protections, although they were not many.

Types of coerced labor

Chattel slavery
The Chattel slaves were mostly captives of war and were brought to different cities and countries to be sold as slaves. All captives, including civilians not a part of the military forces, were seen as a royal resource. The pharaoh could resettle captives by moving them into colonies for labor, giving them to temples, giving them as rewards to deserving individuals, or giving them to his soldiers as loot. Some chattel slaves began as free people who were found guilty of committing illicit acts and were forced to give up their freedom. Other chattel slaves were born into the life from a slave mother.

Bonded laborers
Ancient Egyptians were able to sell themselves and children into slavery in a form of bonded labor. Self-sale into servitude was not always a choice made by the individuals' free will, but rather a result of individuals who were unable to pay off their debts. The creditor would wipe the debt by acquiring the individual who was in debt as a slave, along with his children and wife. The debtor would also have to give up all that was owned. Peasants were also able to sell themselves into slavery for food or shelter.

Some slaves were bought in slave markets near the Asiatic area and then bonded as war prisoners. Not all were from foreign areas outside of Egypt but it was popular for slaves to be found and collected abroad. This act of slavery grew Egypt's military status and strength. Bonded laborers dreamed of emancipation but never knew if it was ever achievable. Slaves foreign to Egypt had possibilities of return to homelands but those brought from Nubia and Libya were forced to stay in the boundaries of Egypt.

The term "Shabti" 
One type of slavery in ancient Egypt granted captives the promise of an afterlife. Ushabtis were funerary figures buried with deceased Egyptians. Historians have concluded these figures represent an ideology of earthly persons' loyalty and bond to a master. Evidence of ushabtis shows great relevance to a slavery-type system. The captives were promised an afterlife in the beyond if they obeyed a master and served as a laborer. The origin of this type of slavery is difficult to pinpoint but some say the slaves were willing to be held captive in return for entrance into Egypt. Entrance into Egypt could also be perceived as having been given "life". Willingness of enslavement is known as self-sale. Others suggest that shabtis were held captive because they were foreigners. The full extent of the origins of shabtis are unclear but historians do recognize that women were paid or compensated in some way for their labor, while men were not. However payment could come in many forms. Although men did not receive monetary wages, shabtis were promised life in the netherworld and that promise could be perceived as payment for them. So Shabtis are associated with bonded labor but historians speculate that there was some sort of choice for the Shabtis.

In the slave market, bonded laborers were commonly sold with a 'slave yoke' or a 'taming stick' to show that the slave was troublesome. This specific type of weaponry to torture the slave has many local names in Egyptian documents but the preferred term is called 'sheyba'. There are other forms of restraint used in Ancient Egypt slave markets more common than the shebya, like ropes and cords.

Forced labor
Several departments in the Ancient Egyptian government were able to draft workers from the general population to work for the state with a corvée labor system. The laborers were conscripted for projects such as military expeditions, mining and quarrying, and construction projects for the state. These slaves were paid a wage, depending on their skill level and social status for their work. Conscripted workers were not owned by individuals, like other slaves, but rather required to perform labor as a duty to the state. Conscripted labor was a form of taxation by government officials and usually happened at the local level when high officials called upon small village leaders.

Masters
Masters of Ancient Egypt were under obligations when owning slaves. Masters were allowed to utilize the abilities of their slaves by employing them in different manners including domestic services (cooks, maids, brewers, nannies, etc.) and labor services (gardeners, stable hands, field hands, etc.). Masters also had the right to force the slave to learn a trade or craft to make the slave more valuable. Masters were forbidden to force child slaves to harsh physical labor.

Economy
Ancient Egypt was a peasant-based economy and it was not until the Greco-Roman period that slavery had a greater impact. Slave dealing in Ancient Egypt was done through private dealers and not through a public market. The transaction had to be performed before a local council or officials with a document containing clauses that were used in other valuable sales. However Pharaohs were able to bypass this, and possessed the power to give slaves to any they saw fit, usually being a vizier or noble.

Slave life
Many slaves who worked for temple estates lived under punitive conditions, but on average the Ancient Egyptian slave led a life similar to a serf. They were capable of negotiating transactions and owning personal property. Chattel and debt slaves were given food but probably not given wages.

There is a consensus among Egyptologists that the Great Pyramids were not built by slaves. According to noted archeologists  Mark Lehner  and Zahi Hawass the pyramids were not built by slaves the archeological find in the 1990s in Cairo discovered by Hawass show the workers were paid laborers, rather than slaves. Rather, it was farmers who built the pyramids during flooding, when they could not work in their lands. The allegation that Israelite slaves built the pyramids was first made by Jewish historian Josephus in Antiquities of the Jews during the first century CE, an account that was subsequently popularized during the Renaissance period. While the idea that the Israelites served as slaves in Egypt features in the Bible, scholars generally agree that the story constitutes an origin myth rather than a historical reality. In any case, the construction of the pyramids does not appear in the story. Modern archaeologists consider that the Israelites were indigenous to Canaan and never resided in ancient Egypt in significant numbers.

Egyptian slaves, specifically during the New Kingdom era, originated from foreign lands. The slaves themselves were seen as an accomplishment to Egyptian kings' reign, and a sign of power. Slaves or bak were seen as property or a commodity to be bought and sold. Their human qualities were disregarded and were merely seen as property to be used for a master's labor. Unlike the more modern term, "serf", Egyptian slaves were not tied to the land; the owner(s) could use the slave for various occupational purposes. The slaves could serve towards the productivity of the region and community. Slaves were generally men, but women and families could be forced into the owner's household service.

The fluidity of a slave's occupation does not translate to "freedom". It is difficult to use the word 'free' as a term to describe slave's political or social independence due to the lack of sources and material from this ancient time period.
Much of the research conducted on Egyptian enslavement has focused on the issue of payment to slaves. Masters did not commonly pay their slaves a regular wage for their service or loyalty. The slaves worked so that they could either enter Egypt and hope for a better life, receive compensation of living quarters and food, or be granted admittance to work in the afterlife. Although slaves were not "free" or rightfully independent, slaves in the New Kingdom were able to leave their master if they had a "justifiable grievance". Historians have read documents about situations where this could be a possibility but it is still uncertain if independence from slavery was attainable.

See also
Slavery in the Bible

References

Ancient Egyptian society
New Kingdom of Egypt
Slavery in Egypt
Debt bondage
Slavery in antiquity